Hugo Henrique Arantes Castro da Silva (born 18 May 1977 in Cabo de Santo Agostinho), simply as Hugo Henrique, is a former Brazilian footballer who played as a striker.

Career
Hugo Henrique played indoor football as a youth, but began playing senior football with Santa Cruz. He left for Sergipe in 1998, before signing a three-year contract with Portugal side Rio Ave in 1999. Hugo Henrique was a prolific goal-scorer for Rio Ave, scoring 36 times in league and cup competitions over two seasons with the club. He continued this good form with Vitória Setúbal, scoring twice in his debut.

References

External links
 

1975 births
Living people
Sportspeople from Pernambuco
Association football forwards
Brazilian footballers
Campeonato Brasileiro Série B players
Santa Cruz Futebol Clube players
Club Sportivo Sergipe players
Primeira Liga players
Rio Ave F.C. players
Liga Portugal 2 players
Vitória F.C. players
C.F. Os Belenenses players
C.D. Santa Clara players
Campeonato Brasileiro Série A players
Esporte Clube Vitória players
Clube de Regatas Brasil players
Treze Futebol Clube players
Salgueiro Atlético Clube players
Lagarto Futebol Clube players
Associação Atlética Coruripe players
Brazilian expatriate footballers
Expatriate footballers in Portugal
Brazilian expatriate sportspeople in Portugal